Greswell or Gresswell may refer to:
Bill Greswell (1889–1971), English cricketer
Dan Gresswell (1819–1883), English veterinary surgeon
Edward Greswell (1797–1869), English churchman and chronologist
Ernest Greswell (1885–1962), English cricketer, brother of Bill Greswell
Jeaffreson Greswell (1916–2000), Royal Air Force officer
Richard Greswell (1800–1881), English academic and re-founder of the National Society
William Parr Greswell (1765–1854), English clergyman and bibliographer, father of Edward and Richard Greswell